Alan Koch (born 30 April 1975) is a South African soccer coach who is the technical director for Olé Football Academy. Koch is a former South African youth national team player, professional player and coach. He is a graduate of Simon Fraser University where he earned his bachelor's degree. He earned his master's degree from Midwestern State University in 2005. He was previously the head coach of FC Cincinnati in Major League Soccer.

Early life 

Koch attended Westville Boys' High School in his native South Africa. He was there selected as the captain of the South African Schoolboys team in 1992. He played for Reservoir Hills United in 1993 and was coached by Professor Ngubane in the OK League which is now known as the Mvela League. He left South Africa in 1995 to sign with KTSV Preussen Krefeld of the German Oberliga. He was also briefly with Wattenscheid 09 and Bayer Uerdingen of the 2.Bundesliga. He signed for Limerick of the League of Ireland in 2000. In 2001, on advice from medical experts, Koch retired from football due to a heart condition.

Coaching career

Midwestern State 

Koch began his coaching tenure as an assistant coach at Midwestern State University. In his first season in 2003, Koch helped the Mustangs finish 17–5 and reach the NCAA Elite Eight. In 2004, he also help guide them to a 12–6 record. In his final year with Midwestern State University in 2005, while completing his master's degree, the Mustangs finished the season 13–3–2. Koch then moved on to Baker University where he was offered the head coaching position.

Baker University 

At Baker University, Koch took on his first head coaching position and finished his first season in charge with a 9–9 record in 2006. The next season, Koch guided the Wildcats to a 13–7 record while reaching the regional semi-finals in the NCAA National Tournament. Koch was then presented with an opportunity to move to Vancouver, British Columbia to take over the Simon Fraser University head coaching position.

Vancouver Whitecaps FC W-League 

Koch also had a spell in charge of the Vancouver Whitecaps W-League team in 2009. He guided the Women's team to a 5th-place finish which narrowly missed out on the playoffs.

Simon Fraser University 

Koch spent seven seasons at Simon Fraser University as the head coach of the Men's Soccer Team. He was the 2009 and 2010 AII coach of the year, and also the 2010, 2011, 2012 GNAC coach of the year. 2011 was also a landmark season for the Men's Soccer Team as they became the first non-American school to be ranked in the NCAA top 25. On 18 October 2011, the Men's Soccer Team reached No. 1 in the NCAA division 2 national rankings. At the conclusion of the NCAA regular season, the Men's Soccer Team remained as the No. 1 team in the NCAA. In November 2012, Simon Fraser University became the first Canadian team to qualify for an NCAA division 2 National Tournament. The team went on a historic run and qualified for the Final Four hosted in Evans, Georgia. At the end of the NCAA season, the Men's Soccer team became the No. 3 ranked team in the NCAA. On 5 December 2012, Koch was named NSCAA Regional Coach of the year. During the 2012 season, Koch and the Simon Fraser University Men's Soccer team were featured in the New York Times. In 2013, Koch again led Simon Fraser to another top four appearance in the NCAA Soccer Division 2 National Tournament.

Team Canada – Maccabiah Games 

Koch helped lead Team Canada in the 2013 Maccabiah Games in Jerusalem, Israel to a bronze medal after a hard-fought 4–1 win against Mexico. Koch's Team Canada qualified to the quarter-finals as the runners up in the group after beating Chile 3–0, Venezuela 4–1 before losing to the defending champions Argentina 4–1 in the final group stage match. They were then drawn against heavy favourites Brazil in the quarter-finals and Canada thrilled the crowd with a big 1–0 win before moving onto playing the United States in the semi-finals. The United States proved to be too much for Team Canada who was sent to the bronze medal match against Mexico.

Vancouver Whitecaps FC 

Koch began his time with Vancouver Whitecaps FC as the primary college scout ahead of the 2015 MLS SuperDraft. With the No. 13 selection in the draft, the Whitecaps selected future U.S. Men's National Team defender Tim Parker, who has emerged as one of MLS' top center backs since becoming a professional.  He formally joined the organisation as the first-ever head coach of Whitecaps FC 2, Vancouver's USL affiliate, on 30 January 2015. After missing out on the USL Cup Playoffs in year one, Koch led Whitecaps FC 2 to its best season in its three years of existence, producing a 12–9–9 record. As the No. 6 seed, Vancouver advanced to the Western Conference Finals of the USL Cup Playoffs.

The head coach gave midfielder Alphonso Davies his first minutes as a professional soccer player at the age of 15 on 2 April 2016 at Portland Timbers 2. Davies went on to sign for Bayern Munich at the end of the 2018 MLS season.

FC Cincinnati 
He joined FC Cincinnati in the United Soccer League as the Director of Scouting and Analytics and Assistant Coach in December 2016. Just two months later, he was named the second head coach in club history on 17 February 2017.

In his first year with FC Cincinnati, Koch guided the club to the semifinal round of the Lamar Hunt U.S. Open Cup. The Orange and Blue claimed wins over MLS sides Columbus Crew SC and the Chicago Fire as well as a win over NASL Fall Champions, Miami FC. In the USL regular season, Koch led FC Cincinnati to a 12–10–10 record, placing Cincinnati in the USL Cup Playoffs for a second-consecutive season.

In 2018, with Koch at the helm, the Orange and Blue had a historic season which saw FC Cincinnati set club highs in total wins (23), total points (77), home wins (12), home points (30), away wins (11), and away points (38). FC Cincinnati claimed the USL Regular Season Championship after posting a 23–3–8 record, earning Cincinnati the top seed in the Eastern Conference for the USL Cup Playoffs. Koch led FC Cincinnati to its first-ever postseason win with the club defeated Nashville SC 1–1 (6–5 on penalties) in an Eastern Conference quarterfinal-round match. Following the conclusion of the season, Koch was named the USL Coach of the Year for Cincinnati's record-breaking season.

Koch remained with FC Cincinnati as they moved up to Major League Soccer. However, after 11 MLS games with a 2–7–2 record, Koch was fired by the club on 7 May 2019. General manager Jeff Berding said the firing was the result of a declining club culture rather than directly due to the results on the pitch.

Colorado Springs Switchbacks 
On 23 September 2019, Koch was named head coach of USL Championship side Colorado Springs Switchbacks FC. In the 2020 coronavirus impacted season Koch improved the team's fortunes from 18th position in the 2019 league standings to 13th position in the 2020 USL Western Conference standings.

FC Edmonton
On 24 November 2020, Koch was named head coach and director of football operations of Canadian Premier League side FC Edmonton.

Managerial statistics

Managerial achievements

Simon Fraser University 
 2009 NAIA Final Four
 A.I.I Champions – 2009, 2010
 2012 NCAA D2 Final Four
 2013 NCAA D2 Final Four
 2014 NCAA 1st round
 GNAC Champions – 2010, 2011, 2012, 2013

United Soccer League 
 2017 US Open Cup Semi-finalist
 2018 USL Regular Season Champions
 2018 USL Coach of the Year

Major League Soccer
 2019 MLS Week Three Coach of the Week
 2019 MLS Week Four Coach of the Week

Certification 

Koch currently holds varying levels of coaching certification. These include NSCAA Premier Diploma with distinction, Canadian A License, USSF A License, SKNFCA Level 2, and UEFA A and B licences.

References

External links 

 Alan Koch's archived biography at FC Cincinnati
 

1975 births
Living people
Canadian soccer coaches
Simon Fraser Clan men's soccer coaches
South African soccer players
South African expatriate soccer players
Expatriate soccer players in Canada
Sportspeople from Durban
FC Cincinnati coaches
FC Edmonton coaches
Canadian Premier League coaches
Association football midfielders
Limerick F.C. players
Whitecaps FC 2
Expatriate soccer managers in Canada
Expatriate soccer managers in the United States
Midwestern State Mustangs
College men's soccer coaches in the United States
Baker Wildcats men's soccer coaches
Colorado Springs Switchbacks FC coaches
USL Championship coaches
Major League Soccer coaches